Diocese/Archidocese/Province/Patriarchate of Babylon (the office and area) or Bishop/Archbishop/Patriarch of Babylon (the person) may refer to:

Babylon, Mesopotamia
 Abdias of Babylon, first bishop of Babylon, one of the Seventy Apostles
 Polychronius, bishop of Babylon; July 30 (Eastern Orthodox liturgics) commemorates his martyrdom in AD 251
 Patriarch of the Church of the East or Patriarch of Babylon
 List of patriarchs of the Church of the East
 Patriarchal Province of Seleucia-Ctesiphon, or the diocese of Seleucia-Ctesiphon within the province
 Chaldean Catholic Patriarchate of Babylon, established after the 1552 schism, based in Baghdad 
 List of Chaldean Catholic patriarchs of Babylon
 Latin Catholic Diocese of Babylon, 1632–1848; subsequently the Archdiocese of Baghdad

Babylon, Egypt
 Diocese of Babylon, at Babylon Fortress in Coptic Cairo, Egypt; an Early Christian suffragan of Leontopolis, now a titular see
 Bishop Babylonos, title since 2009 of the hegumen of the Monastery of St George under the Greek Orthodox Patriarchate of Alexandria